The Japanese Experiment Module (JEM), nicknamed , is a Japanese science module for the International Space Station (ISS) developed by JAXA. It is the largest single ISS module, and is attached to the Harmony module. The first two pieces of the module were launched on Space Shuttle missions STS-123 and STS-124. The third and final components were launched on STS-127.

Components 

In initial configuration, Kibō consisted of six major elements:
 Pressurized Module (PM)
 Exposed Facility (EF)
 Experiment Logistics Module (ELM) Pressurized Section (ELM-PS)
 Experiment Logistics Module (ELM) Exposed Section (ELM-ES)
 Japanese Experiment Module remote manipulator system (JEMRMS)
 Inter-orbit communication system (ICS)

Pressurized Module 

The Pressurized Module (PM) is the core component connected to the port hatch of Harmony. It is cylindrical in shape and contains twenty-three International Standard Payload Racks (ISPRs), ten of which are dedicated to science experiments while the remaining thirteen are dedicated to Kibōs systems and storage. The racks are placed in a 6-6-6-5 format along the four walls of the module. The end of the PM has an airlock and two window hatches. The exposed facility, experiment logistics module, and remote manipulator system all connect to the PM. It is the location for many of the press conferences that take place on board the station.

Exposed facility 

The Exposed Facility (EF), also known as "Terrace", is located outside the port cone of the PM (which is equipped with an airlock). The EF has twelve Exposed Facility Unit (EFU) ports which attach to Payload Interface Unit (PIU) connectors on EF-equipment exchange units (EF-EEUs). All experiment payloads are fully exposed to the space environment. For proper functioning of these experiments, the payload requires an orbital replacement unit (ORU), consisting of the electrical power system (EPS), communications and tracking (CT), and the thermal control system (TCS). Of the twelve ORUs, eight are replaceable by the JEMRMS while the other four are EVA-replaceable.

Logistics module 

The experiment logistics module (ELM) includes two sections:
 The pressurized section (ELM-PS), also called the JLP (Japanese logistics pressurized), is a pressurized addition to the PM. It is used as a storage facility, providing storage space for experiment payloads, samples and spare items.
 The unpressurized (external) section (ELM-ES) serves as a storage and transportation module.  It was used to transfer external experiments with the Space Shuttle.  It is not used after the retirement of the shuttle.

Remote manipulator system 
The JEM remote manipulator system (JEMRMS) is a  robotic arm, mounted at the port cone of the PM. It is used for servicing the EF and for moving equipment to and from the ELM. The JEMRMS control console was launched while inside the ELM-PS, and the main arm was launched with the PM. Once HTV had docked, the small fine arm was assembled by the crew and deployed outside the airlock to test it. The JEMRMS grappled the arm and unfolded it to flex the joints before stowing it onto the EF. The free end of the JEMRMS is able to use the same type of grapple fixtures that the Canadarm2 uses.

Inter-orbit Communication System 
Inter-orbit Communication System (ICS) consists of a rack of communication module in the Pressurized Module (ICS-PM) and the antenna module to be attached on the Exposed Facility (ICS-EF).  It was used to communicate with the ground station via JAXA's communication technology demonstration satellite .  
After the decommissioning of DRTS in August 2017, Kibō relies on the ISS's Ku band communication through NASA's TDRSS.  ICS-EF was disposed by jettisoning into orbit in February 2020 and reentered on March 17, 2023 over Sacramento, California.

Launch sequence 

NASA launched the JEM complex over three flights using the Space Shuttle. The shuttle had a large payload bay which carried the modules into orbit along with the crew. This is in contrast to the Russian modules, which are launched into orbit on multistage Proton rockets and then rendezvous and dock with the station automatically.

On 12 March 2007, the Experiment Logistics Module-Pressurized Section (ELM-PS), the main laboratory, arrived at the Kennedy Space Center (KSC) from Japan. It was stored in the Space Station Processing Facility (SSPF) until launched into orbit aboard Endeavour on 11 March 2008 as part of the STS-123 mission.

On 30 May 2003, the Pressurized Module (PM) arrived at KSC from Japan. It was stored at the SSPF until launched into orbit aboard Discovery on 31 May 2008 as part of the STS-124 mission. On 3 June 2008, the PM was attached to the Harmony module. At first the ELM-PS, the small cargo bay, was connected to a temporary location on Harmony and later, on 6 June 2008, was moved to its final berthing location on top (zenith) of the main laboratory.

The Exposed Facility (EF) and Experiment Logistics Module-External Section (ELM-ES) arrived at KSC on 24 September 2008. The two elements were launched on Endeavour on 15 July 2009 as part of the STS-127 mission. The ELM-ES was brought back to Earth at the end of the mission. The assembly of the EF was completed during the fifth spacewalk of the mission.

Specifications 

Kibō is the largest single ISS module:

 Pressurized module
 Length: 
 Diameter: 
 Mass: 
 Launch Date: 31 May 2008
 Experiment logistics module - Pressurized Section
 Length: 
 Diameter: 
 Mass: 
 Launch Date: 11 March 2008

 Exposed Facility
 Length: 
 Diameter: 
 Height: 
 Mass: 
 Launch Date: 15 July 2009

 Robotic Arm
 Main Arm (MA)
 Length: 
 Mass: 
 Handling Capacity: Max. 7000|kg(Payload size: 1.85m x 1.0m x 0.8m / weight: less than 500kg)
 Small Fine Arm (SFA)
 Length: 
 Mass: 
 Handling Capacity: Max. 80kg with Compliance Control Mode, Max. 300kg without Compliance Control Mode(ORU size: 0.62 x 0.42 x 0.41m / weight: 80kg max)

The module and all its integrated accessories were manufactured at the Tsukuba Space Center in Japan. It is made from stainless steel, titanium, and aluminum.

Experiments on Kibō

Current external experiments 
 MAXI – X-ray astronomy from 0.5 to 30 keV. Exposed Facility Slot 1.
STP Houston 8 Payload-COWVR and TEMPEST Launched on SpaceX CRS-24 in 2021. Exposed Facility Slot 2 port originally held CREAM which was moved to Slot 7. (End of mission temp stowed on the roof of the science logistics module will be replaced by STP-H9 when it arrives on SpaceX CRS-27.) 
 OCO-3 – Monitoring of carbon dioxide in the Earth's atmosphere using a flight spare from OCO-2. Exposed Facility Slot 3 port originally held SMILES.
 NREP – Nanoracks External Platform. NREP-2 is the current mission on this pallet. Exposed Facility Slot 4.
 i-SEEP – IVA-replaceable Small Exposed Experiment Platform (JAXA). Mounted to Exposed Facility Slot 5. It is a platform to support small-to-medium (less than 200 kg) payloads. Experiments on the i-SEEP platform are HDTV-EF2 (since 2017), GPSR/Wheel, and SOLISS (since 2019).
 GEDI – Global Ecosystem Dynamics Investigation on ISS Exposed Facility Slot 6 port originally held HREP.
 CREAM – Cosmic Ray Energetics and Mass Experiment. Launched on SpaceX CRS-12 in 2017. Initially at Exposed Facility Slot 2. Moved to Slot 7 in 2021.
 HISUI –  Hyperspectral Imager Suite (METI) replacement for HREP which ended its mission in 2017. Exposed Facility Slot 8 port originally held MCE.
 CALET – CALorimetric Electron Telescope (JAXA), observation for high energy cosmic rays. Launched aboard Kounotori 5 (HTV-5). Mass: 2500 kg. Exposed Facility Slot 9 port originally held SEDA-AP.
 ExHAM 1 and 2 – External Facility Handrail Attach Mechanism (JAXA). Mounted to the deck on handrails in the forward and aft locations next to slots 7 and 10.
 ECOSTRESS – Ecosystem Spaceborne Thermal Radiometer Experiment on Space Station. Exposed Facility Slot 10 port originally held the ELM-ES and the HTV Transfer Pallet.
 i-SEEP2 - IVA-replaceable Small Exposed Experiment Platform 2, at Exposed Facility slot 11.

Former external experiments 
Deorbited with Kounotori 5 (HTV-5):
 SMILES – Observes and monitors very weak sub-millimeter wave emission lines of trace gas molecules in the stratosphere.
 MCE – Multi-mission Consolidated Equipment (NASA).

Deorbited with SpaceX CRS-15:
 HREP – Hyperspectral Imager for the Coastal Ocean (HICO) and Remote Atmospheric and Ionospheric Detection System (RAIDS) experimental payload.

Deorbited with SpaceX CRS-17:
 CATS – Cloud-Aerosol Transport System (LiDAR, NASA). Originally held in Slot 5, will be replaced by MOLI.

Jettisoned into orbit by ISS robotic arm:
 SEDA-AP – Space Environment Data Acquisition equipment-Attached Payload. Measures neutrons, plasma, heavy ions, and high-energy light particles in the station's orbit.
 ICS-EF – Inter-orbit Communication System-Exposed Facility, Japanese communication system. Originally at the Exposed Facility Slot 7.

Current internal experiments 
Japanese:
 RYUTAI Rack  – Fluid Physics Experiment Facility (FPEF), Solution Crystallization Observation Facility (SCOF), Protein Crystallization Research Facility (PCRF), Image Processing Unit (IPU)
 SAIBO Rack  – Cell Biology Experiment Facility (CBEF), Clean Bench (CB)
 KOBAIRO Rack  – Gradient Heating Furnace (GHF)
 MPSR-1 – Multi-Purpose Small payload Rack-1
 MPSR-2 – Multi-Purpose Small payload Rack-2, housing Electrostatic Levitating Furnace (ELF)

American:
 EXPRESS Rack 4 – Biotechnology Specimen Temperature Controller (BSTC), Gas Supply Module (GSM), Space Acceleration Measurement System-II (SAMS-II), Biotechnology Specimen Temperature Controller (BSTC), Nanoracks NanoLab
 EXPRESS Rack 5
 MELFI-1 – two −80° freezer racks
 Life Sciences Glovebox (LSG)

Planned experiments 

 MOLI – Multi-footprint Observation Lidar and Imager (JAXA) (external)
 JEM-EUSO (internal)

Parts

See also 

 Scientific research on the ISS
 Nanoracks CubeSat Deployer (NRCSD)

References

External links 

 Japanese Experiment Module (Kibō) at JAXA.jp

 
Components of the International Space Station
Space program of Japan
Laboratories in Japan
Spacecraft launched in 2008
Spacecraft launched by the Space Shuttle